Ted Wade may refer to:

 Ted Wade (Australian footballer) (1884–1966), Australian rules footballer
 Ted Wade (footballer, born 1901) (1901–?), English football (soccer) player

See also
 Edward Wade (disambiguation)
 Theodore Wade-Gery (1888–1972), British historian